Nimta Higher Secondary School, also known as Nimta High School, is a secondary (Madhyamik) level and Higher Secondary (Uchha Madhyamik) standard school in Nimta, Kolkata, West Bengal, India that was established on 1 January 1875. This school is affiliated to West Bengal Board of Secondary Education and West Bengal Council of Higher Secondary Education

See also
Education in India
List of schools in India
Education in West Bengal

References

External links
 

High schools and secondary schools in Kolkata
Educational institutions established in 1875
1875 establishments in India